Robert  V. McGarvey (October 2, 1888 - October 31, 1952) was an American National Champion trainer of Thoroughbred racehorses whose clients included prominent owners John D. Hertz, Ethel V. Mars, Stuyvesant Peabody, Henrietta Bingham and Emil and Jean Denemark.

In 1935 Robert McGarvey trained Forever Yours to earn American Champion Two-Year-Old Filly honors. In 1937, McGarvey was the U.S. Champion Thoroughbred Trainer by earnings.

Between 1928 and 1951, Robert McGarvey had eight starters in the Kentucky Derby. His best results were three third-place finishes with Whiskolo (1935),  Reaping Reward (1937) and  Ruhe in 1951.

Robert McGarvey died at age 64 on October 31, 1952, at St. Joseph Hospital in Joliet, Illinois, after suffering a heart attack.

References

1888 births
1952 deaths
American horse trainers
American Champion racehorse trainers
American racehorse owners and breeders
People from Lacon, Illinois